The 1990 Soul Train Music Awards  was held at the Shrine Auditorium in Los Angeles, California and aired live in select cities on March 14, 1990 (and was later syndicated in other areas), honoring the best in R&B, soul, rap, jazz, and gospel music from the previous year. The show was hosted by Patti LaBelle, Luther Vandross and Dionne Warrick.

Special awards

Heritage Award for Career Achievement
 Quincy Jones

Sammy Davis Jr. Award for Entertainer of the Year
 Arsenio Hall

Winners and nominees
Winners are in bold text.

Best R&B/Urban Contemporary Album – Male
 Babyface – Tender Lover
 Bobby Brown – Dance!...Ya Know It!
 Quincy Jones – Back on the Block
 Luther Vandross – The Best of Luther Vandross... The Best of Love

Best R&B/Urban Contemporary Album – Female
 Janet Jackson – Rhythm Nation 1814
 Regina Belle – Stay with Me
 Stacy Lattisaw – What You Need
 Stephanie Mills – Home

Best R&B/Urban Contemporary Album – Group, Band, or Duo
 Soul II Soul – Club Classics Vol. One
 Heavy D and the Boyz – Big Tyme
 Maze and Frankie Beverly – Silky Soul
 Milli Vanilli – Girl You Know It's True

Best R&B/Urban Contemporary Single – Male
 Luther Vandross – "Here and Now"
 Babyface – "It's No Crime"
 Bobby Brown – "Every Little Step"
 Eric Gable – "Remember (The First Time)"

Best R&B/Urban Contemporary Single – Female
 Janet Jackson – "Miss You Much"
 Regina Belle – "Baby Come to Me"
 Vesta – "Congratulations"
 Karyn White – "Secret Rendezvous"

Best R&B/Urban Contemporary Single – Group, Band, or Duo
 Soul II Soul – "Keep On Movin'"
 Guy – "I Like"
 Surface – "Shower Me with Your Love"
 Sweet Obsession – "Cash"

Best R&B/Urban Contemporary Song of the Year
 Soul II Soul – "Keep On Movin'"
 Paula Abdul – "Straight Up"
 Bobby Brown – "Every Little Step"
 Luther Vandross – "Here and Now"

Best Music Video
 Janet Jackson – "Rhythm Nation"
 Eric Gable – "Remember (The First Time)"
 Quincy Jones – "I'll Be Good to You"
 Prince – "Batdance"

Best R&B/Urban Contemporary New Artist
 David Peaston
 Eric Gable
 Soul II Soul
 Young MC

Best Rap Album
 Heavy D and the Boyz – Big Tyme
 Big Daddy Kane – It's a Big Daddy Thing
 De La Soul – 3 Feet High and Rising
 Young MC – Stone Cold Rhymin'

Best Jazz Album
 Quincy Jones – Back on the Block
 Alex Bugnon – Love Seasons
 Kenny G – Kenny G Live
 Joe Sample – Spellbound

Best Gospel Album
 BeBe & CeCe Winans – Heaven
 Al Green – I Get Joy
 Mississippi Mass Choir – Mississippi Mass Choir Live
 The Winans – Live at Carnegie Hall

Performances
 Regina Belle – "Baby Come to Me"
 Big Daddy Kane – "I Get the Job Done"
 Bobby Brown – "On Our Own"
 Milli Vanilli – "Blame It on the Rain"
 Quincy Jones Tribute:
 Dionne Warwick
 Luther Vandross – "The First Time Ever I Saw Your Face"
 Patti LaBelle – "Just Once"
 Tevin Campbell – "Tomorrow (A Better You, Better Me)"
 Soul II Soul – "Back to Life" / "Jazzie's Groove"
 Jody Watley – "Everything"
 The Winans and Teddy Riley – "It's Time"

References

Soul Train Music Awards
Soul
Soul
Soul Train
1990 in Los Angeles